So Feared a Hell (El infierno tan temido) is a 1980 Argentine film scored by Astor Piazzolla.

Cast

External links 
 

1980 films
Argentine drama films
1980s Spanish-language films
Films directed by Raúl de la Torre
Films shot in Buenos Aires
1980s Argentine films